1871 is a 1990 period film about the rise and fall of the Paris Commune in 1871. It was directed by Ken McMullen and produced by Stewart Richards. The writers were McMullen, James Leahy and Terry James. It was screened in the Un Certain Regard section at the 1990 Cannes Film Festival. The film stars Ana Padrao, Roshan Seth, John Lynch, Jack Klaff, and Timothy Spall.

Cast
Ana Padrao - Severine
Roshan Seth - Grafton
John Lynch - O'Brien
Jack Klaff - Cluseret
Timothy Spall - Ramborde 
Dominique Pinon - Napoleon III
Maria de Medeiros - Maria
Med Hondo - Karl Marx
Cédric Michiels - The Urchin

References

External links

1990 films
French romantic drama films
Films about the Paris Commune
1990 romantic drama films
Films set in 1871
British romantic drama films
English-language French films
Films directed by Ken McMullen
Cultural depictions of Napoleon III
Cultural depictions of Karl Marx
1990s British films
1990s French films